Friedrich "Fritz" Stoll (January 23, 1909 – March 6, 1989) was an American soccer player who was a member of the United States soccer team at the 1936 Summer Olympics.  He also played ten seasons in the American Soccer League.

Stoll signed with the Philadelphia German-Americans in 1933. He would play for the German-Americans until 1943. In 1935, Stoll and his team mates won the league title.  A year later, they won the 1936 National Challenge Cup.  He was selected for the 1936 U.S. Olympic soccer team, but did not play in the lone U.S. game of the tournament.

References

American soccer players
Olympic soccer players of the United States
Footballers at the 1936 Summer Olympics
American Soccer League (1933–1983) players
Uhrik Truckers players
1909 births
1989 deaths
Association football defenders